Deinopa angitia is a species of moth in the family Erebidae first described by Herbert Druce in 1891. It is found in Central and North America.

The MONA or Hodges number for Deinopa angitia is 8590.2.

References

Further reading

 
 
 
 

Anobinae
Articles created by Qbugbot
Moths described in 1891